Pumbedita Academy or Pumbedita Yeshiva (sometimes Pumbeditha, Pumpedita, Pumbedisa) was a yeshiva in Babylon during the era of the Amoraim and Geonim sages. It was founded by Judah bar Ezekiel (220–299 CE) and, with the Sura Academy founded in 225 by Abba Arika, was an influential and dominant yeshiva for about 800 years.

History
After Abba Arikha and Samuel of Nehardea died at the end of the first generation of the Amoraim, along with the designation of Rav Huna as dean Sura, Judah bar Ezekiel went to the city of Pumbedita and had established a new yeshiva there. Pumbedita Academy was active for about 800 years over the course of the eras of the Amoraim, Savoraim, and Geonim up until the days of Hai Gaon.

At the time, the academies of Pumbedita and Sura became the most influential and dominant yeshivas of the Jewish communities' world, and all Torah decrees and other religious rulings were issued from these Yeshivas to all the Jewish diaspora. Pumbedita Academy served as a field of growth to the greatest Jewish sages for generations to come, among them: Rabbah bar Nahmani ("Rabbah"), Rav Yosef b. Hiyya, Abaye and Amora sage Rava, Savora sages Rabbah Jose and Simuna, and Geonim Rab Rabbah Gaon and Paltoi ben Abbaye Gaon, as well as Sherira Gaon and his son, Hai Gaon. Pumbedita Academy was at its peak during the third and fourth generation of the Amoraim. During the days of the Amora sage Rava, Pumbedita Academy moved to Mahuza (modern al-Mada'in), but after his death, it returned to Pumbedita.

After with the sealing of the Talmud by Ravina II Sura, the era of the Savoraim began (499-589), in which most part of that period, proper studying on regular basis no longer took place in Sura, only in Pumbedita.

During the era of the Geonim, the two Talmudic academies were correspondingly active as well. One of Pumbedita's Gaons and dean of the Academy, Hai Gaon (approximately in years 988-990), moved the academy to Baghdad because the number of Jews making a living from agriculture was growing smaller and they were migrating to the big cities, mainly to Baghdad (apart from the phenomenon of Jewish emigration out of Babylonia). However, the academy's name remained "Pumbedita Academy" despite its relocation.

The last period of Pumbedita Academy growth took place during the days of Sherira Gaon and his son, Hai Gaon. Thousands of letters with halachic issues attached were received at Pumbedita, addressed to the heads of the Academy from all around the Jewish diaspora. The Geonim of the Academy worked hard to respond to their questions. Along with Hai Gaon's death ( 1038), the era of the Geonim ended.

Hezekiah Gaon and Bostanai were appointed deans of Pumbedita Academy, the only men to be simultaneously a Gaon and Exilarch. Twenty years later, Hezekiah Gaon, by some accounts, was tortured to death by the Muslim Buyid dynasty and Pumbedita Academy closed.

List of Pumbedita academy's deans

Amora era
Judah bar Ezekiel:
the 1st Rosh yeshiva (and a disciple of Abba Arika and Samuel of Nehardea)
Huna b. Hiyya
Rabbah bar Nahmani ("Rabbah")
Rav Yosef b. Hiyya
Rava:
After Abaye's death the academy was united under him and moved to Mahuza (al-Mada'in)
Rav Nachman bar Yitzchak
Rav Kahana IV
Aha b. Raba
Rav Rahumi I
Sama b. Rabba

Savora era
Rabbah Jose
Simuna
Rabbai of Rob:
The academy was relocated to Firuz Shapur Anbar due to pogroms against Jews, and moved back to Pumbedita city after 50 years

Geonim era

Hanan of Iskiya – from 589
Mari ben R. Dimi Sargo – around 591
Rav Hana (Huna) – around 630
Rav Ravah (Rava) – 651
Rav Bosai (Bostanai) – around 660
Huna Mari ben Mar R. Joseph – around 689
Hiyya of Meshan – around 700
Rav Rabya ben R. Abaye (Moronai) – around 710
Natronai b. Mar Nehemiah (called Mar R. Yanka) – 719
Judah Gaon – around 730
Joseph Gaon ben Kitnai (called Mar Kitnai) – 739–748
Samuel ben Mar R. Mari – 748–755
Natroi Kahana b. Emuna (Natrunai, ha-Kohen) – around 755–761
Abraham Kahana (ha-Kohen) – apparently 761
Dodai ben R. Nahman (Rav Dorai) (brother of R. Yehudai, Gaon of Sura Academy) – 761–767
R. Hananya ben R. Mesharsheya – 767–771
Malka ben R. Aha – 771–773
Rabba ben R. Dodai (Abba) (ancestor of R. Sherira Gaon) – 773–782
Rav Shinwai (Shinui) – in 782
Haninai Kahana ben Abraham (ha-Kohen) – 782–786
Huna ben ha-Levi ben Isaac – 786–788
Manasseh ben R. Joseph – 788–796
Isaiah ha-Levi ben R. Abba – 796–798
Joseph ben R. Shila of Shilhe – 798–804
Kahana ben Haninai Gaon (ha-Kohen) – 804–810
Abumai Kahana ben Abraham (Ikhomai, ha-Kohen) – 810–814
Joseph ben R. Abba – 814–816
Abraham ben R. Sherira – 816–828
Joseph ben Mar R. Hiyya – 828–833
Isaac ben R. Hananiah (Hunai, Hiyya) – 833–839
Joseph ben R. Abba (R. Rabbi, Ravrevay) – 839–841
Paltoi ben Abaye – 841–858
Aha Kahana ben Mar Rav (ha-Kohen) – in 858
Menahem ben R. Joseph ben Hiyya – 858–860
Mattithiah ha-Kohen b. Ravrevay b. Hanina (R. Rabbi) – 860–869
Abba ben Ammi ben Samuel (Rabba) – 869–872
Zemah ben Paltoi Gaon – 872–889
Hai ben R. David – 898–890
Kimoi ben R. Ahhai Gaon (Qimoi, ha-Kohen, Ahi) – 896–905
Mebasser Kahana ben R. Kimoi Gaon (ha-Kohen, Qimoi) – 905–917
Kohen Tzedek Kahana ben Joseph (father of Nehemiah ben Kohen Tzedek) – 917–922 
Zemah ben Kafnai (Pappai) – 935–937
Hananiah ben Yehudai Gaon (Judah) (father of R. Sherira Gaon) – 937–943
Aaron ibn Sargado – 943–960
Nehemiah ben Kohen Tzedek – 960–968
Sherira Gaon – 968–1006, Passed the torch to his son Hai Gaon, while he was still alive. The Iggeret Rav Sherira Gaon ("[The] Epistle of Rav Sherira Gaon") is accounted as an important historian source, especially to Jewish history.
Hai Gaon ben Sherira – 1004, died in 1038. His death is considered the conclusion of the era of the Geonim sages.
Exilarch Hezekiah Gaon – 1038–1040 – was killed by a Muslim ruler of the Buyid dynasty, although there were accounts that he was freed from prison and reinstalled at the head of the academy.

Source:

See also
 History of the Jews in Iraq
 Talmudic Academies in Babylonia
 Firuz Shapur, modern-day Anbar, a town adjacent or identical to Nehardea; academy of Pumbedita was moved to this town for half of the 6th century
 Mahuza, modern-day Al-Mada'in; the academy of Pumbedita was relocated to Mahuza during the time of the Amora sage Rava
 Nehardea Academy (in Nehardea)
 Pumbedita, seat of Pumbedita Academy for most of its history; near modern-day Fallujah
 Pum-Nahara Academy
 Sura Academy, in Sura (city) – the political center of Jewish Babylonia after Nehardea
 Talmudic Academies in Syria Palaestina (in the Land of Israel)

References

External links
Pumbedita, Jewish Virtual Library;Article

Talmudic Academies in Babylonia
Religious academies in Babylon
Jewish Babylonian history
Jewish education
Jewish educational organizations
Talmud
Chazal